Harold H. Johnson (January 30, 1920 – September 17, 1999) was an American professional basketball player. He played in the Basketball Association of America for the Detroit Falcons in the first year of the league's existence (1946–47) and averaged 0.6 points per game.

A three-year letterman for the Indiana State Sycamores, "Big Stoop" led the Sycamores to the 3rd round of the 1942 NAIA Tournament.  The "Fightin' Trees' dropped a close game to the eventual champions, the Hamline Pipers.

Following World War II, he joined his former college coach Glenn Curtis in the BAA with the Detroit Falcons.  Following his professional basketball career, Johnson began a law enforcement career as an Indiana State Trooper.

BAA career statistics

Regular season

References

External links

1920 births
1999 deaths
American men's basketball players
Basketball players from Indiana
Centers (basketball)
Detroit Falcons (basketball) players
Indiana State Sycamores men's basketball players
Sportspeople from Richmond, Indiana